NGC 2357 is a spiral galaxy located in the constellation of Gemini. It was discovered by Édouard Stephan on 6 February 1885.

Supernovae
SN 2010bj, a Type II-P supernova, was detected in February 2010, and SN 2015I, a Type Ia supernova was detected in May 2015.

References

Unbarred spiral galaxies
Gemini (constellation)
2357
3782
20592
Discoveries by Édouard Stephan